Alder is a lunar impact crater that is located in the southern hemisphere on the far side of the Moon. It is located in the South Pole-Aitken basin, and lies to the southeast of the crater Von Kármán. Southeast of Alder is Bose, and to the south-southwest lies Boyle.

The inner wall of Alder is rough and slightly terraced, with the material scattered across the edges of the otherwise relatively flat interior floor. There are several low central ridges lying along a band from the midpoint toward the eastern rim. A small crater lies on the eastern inner slopes. The crater is otherwise free of significant impacts within the rim.

Alder is associated with the only area in the basin not dominated by the pyroxene rocks typical of lunar lowlands. This alder ejecta area is on spectrographic evidence instead principally anorthosite rock, typical of the lunar highlands.

Satellite craters
By convention these features are identified on lunar maps by placing the letter on the side of the crater midpoint that is closest to Alder.

References

External links

 (This article on South Pole-Aitken (SPA) basin mentions Alder crater.)

Impact craters on the Moon